The Klimov M-103 is a V12 liquid-cooled piston aircraft engine used by Soviet aircraft during World War II.

Design and development
The M-103 was a further development of the Klimov M-100 engine that was itself a licensed copy of the French Hispano-Suiza 12Ybrs.  It differed from both engines in a number of aspects such as increased compression ratio, increased supercharger ratio, increased rpm's, strengthened cylinder blocks, a new crankshaft, a more aggressive camshaft, and flat bottomed cylinders.  Developed in 1936 it was ready for testing in October 1936.  The first two models failed testing due to cracked cylinder blocks and the engine was resubmitted for testing in 1937.  After passing its trials it was cleared for production in 1938 and 11,681 were produced until 1942 at its factory in Rybinsk.  The M-103 was followed by the M-105.

Variants
 M-103A - 148mm rather than 150mm bore cylinders. 
 M-103P - A ShVAK cannon fitted to fire through the engine vee. 
 M-103SP -  A proposed version with two engines married to a common crankshaft.
 M-103G - With Glycol rather than water cooling.
 M-103A-TK - With an experimental Turbo-Supercharger
 M-103U - Improved service life variant.
 M-104 - Basically a M-103A with a two speed single stage supercharger for increased performance.  232 built.

Applications
 Bolkhovitinov S
 Beriev MBR-7
 Polikarpov TsKB-44
 Polikarpov VIT-1 & VIT-2
 Tupolev SB
 Yakovlev Yak-2
 Yakovlev Yak-12
 Yakovlev Yak-22

Specifications (M-103A)

See also

References

Notes

Bibliography

 Gunston, Bill. World Encyclopedia of Aero Engines. Cambridge, England. Patrick Stephens Limited, 1989. 
 

1930s aircraft piston engines
M-103